The 2018 Japanese motorcycle Grand Prix was the sixteenth round of the 2018 MotoGP season. It was held at the Twin Ring Motegi in Motegi on 21 October 2018. Marc Márquez clinched his third consecutive MotoGP title after Andrea Dovizioso crashed during the penultimate lap. This is his fifth championship in the premier class and seventh overall.

Classification

MotoGP

 Jorge Lorenzo withdrew from the event due to left wrist injury suffered at the Thailand GP.

Moto2

Moto3

Championship standings after the race
Bold text indicates the World Champions.

MotoGP

Moto2

Moto3

Notes

References

Japan
Motorcycle Grand Prix
Japanese motorcycle Grand Prix
Japanese motorcycle Grand Prix